The Time of No Time Evermore is the first full-length studio album by Dutch occult-themed rock group The Devil's Blood. It was released in Europe on 11 September 2009 through VÁN Records and later distributed in the United States on 25 May 2010 through AFM Records.

Track listing

Personnel

The Devil's Blood 
 Farida 'F. the Mouth of Satan' Lemouchi - vocals
 Selim 'SL' Lemouchi - guitar
 Ron 'R' van Herpen - guitar
 Thomas 'T' Sciarone - guitar
 Job 'J' van de Zande - bass guitar
 Sander 'S' van Baalen - drums

Additional musicians 
 Willem 'Will Power' Verbuyst - lead guitar on "The Anti Kosmik Magick"

Production 
 Pieter Kloos - production, engineering
 Selim 'SL' Lemouchi - production

Design 
 Erik Danielsson - artwork

References

External links
 

2009 debut albums
The Devil's Blood albums